Tiger Lily was a short-lived glam rock band and the seed of Ultravox! (later changed to Ultravox). It was founded in London in April 1974 by Royal College of Art student Dennis Leigh (vocals), who left his northern industrial environment in Lancashire, Chris St. John (bass) (born Christopher Allen), another college student who previously played with Stoned Rose, and Stevie Shears (guitar), a Dagenham based musician. The following month, British-Canadian drummer Warren Cann (drums), who was recently rejected as a band member by Sparks, joined the band, followed by William Currie (violin, keyboards), named Billy Currie, who was in a theatre band, later in the year.

In August 1974, still as a four-piece band, without Currie, Tiger Lily made their first gig in Chorley, Lancashire, hometown of Leigh. The band wore clothes like New York Dolls, who influenced them. However, their true first show was in the Marquee Club, London, supporting Heavy Metal Kids. Later, Billy Currie joined originally as violinist.

The band had a glam style influenced by Rolling Stones, Beatles late era, and the current glam artists (like David Bowie, Roxy Music, New York Dolls and Steve Harley). Gull Records released on 14 March 1975 their only 7" single named "Ain't Misbehavin'", which was a cover of the Fats Waller song, while the B-side was "Monkey Jive". After a number of live concerts, the band changed names many times: The Damned, The Zips, Fire Of London, etc. until October 1976, when they decided on Ultravox!. During the pre-Ultravox! era (including Tiger Lily years), they composed many songs later to appear on their first album in early 1977, Ultravox!. By that time Leigh adopted the stage name John Foxx, and Chris St. John became Chris Cross.

Their version of "Ain't Misbehavin'" was released on CD in 2000, in a compilation album of glam rock and pre-punk bands called Glitterbest - 20 Pre Punk 'n' Glam Terrace Stompers. The 1975 single, "Monkey Jive", was never released on CD.

References

External links
Ultravox official fan page
The Warren Cann Forum
MySpace: Tiger Lily
Interview to Warren Cann by Jonas Wårstad

English glam rock groups
Protopunk groups
Ultravox
Musical groups established in 1973